Edward Lewis Tixier (July 7, 1929 – June 3, 1999) was a lieutenant general in the United States Air Force who served as commander of United States Forces Japan and Fifth Air Force from 1984 until his retirement in 1988. He also served as deputy assistant secretary of defense for Near Eastern and South Asian Affairs from 1983 to 1984. Born in Clayton, New Mexico, Tixier attended the United States Military Academy and University of New Mexico was commissioned through ROTC in 1953. He died from a blood disorder in 1999.

References

1929 births
1999 deaths
Auburn University alumni
Recipients of the Defense Distinguished Service Medal
Recipients of the Defense Superior Service Medal
Recipients of the Distinguished Flying Cross (United States)
Recipients of the Legion of Merit
United States Air Force generals
United States Air Force personnel of the Vietnam War
University of New Mexico alumni